The cuíca is a Brazilian friction drum with a large pitch range, produced by changing tension on the head of the drum. Cuíca is Portuguese for the gray four-eyed opossum (Philander opossum) which is known for its high-pitched cry. It is frequently used in carnivals, as well as often in samba music. The tone it produces has a high-pitched squeaky timbre. It has been called a 'laughing gourd' due to this sound. Many also liken its sound to that of a monkey.

History

There are a number of styles of  found around the globe. Its origins are disputed: Different sources trace it to Bantu enslaved people, to Spain, and to Muslim traders - structurally it is identical, among other instruments in the same category, to the Portuguese , Spanish , Catalan  and Balearic  The cuica was used in Africa as a call for the male lion since the sound mimics the roar of the female lioness. The instrument was introduced to Brazil by enslaved people from Africa, where it found its place in samba music.

Characteristics
 
The cuíca has a wooden stick fastened at one end inside the drum in the center of the drumhead. This stick is rosined and rubbed with a cloth. Changing the pressure on the head of the drum from the outside produces the different pitches and timbres. The body of the cuíca is normally made of metal, gourd or synthetic material. It has a single head, normally  in diameter, made of animal skin. A thin bamboo stick is attached to the center of, and perpendicular to, the drum head, extending into the drum's interior. The instrument is held under one arm at chest height with the help of a shoulder strap. To play the cuíca, the stick is rubbed up and down with a wet cloth held in one hand while using the fingers of the other hand to press down on the skin of the drum near the place where the stick is attached. The rubbing motion produces the sound and the pitch is increased or decreased by changing the pressure on the head.

Usage

The cuíca is used to accompany a variety of different folk and urban popular dances. For example, it may be part of the instrumental ensemble for the May dança de Santa Cruz or for the moçambique dramatic dance (bailado) in Minas Gerais. It also is used in Holy Cross dances and processions and in performances of São Paulo rural sambas.

The cuíca plays an important rhythmic role in samba music of all kinds. It is particularly notable as a fixture of Rio de Janeiro's Carnival groups, which feature entire sections of cuíca players. It is so commonly used in radio-oriented samba music that in the absence of a cuíca player, Brazilian singers or other musicians imitate the sound of the cuíca with their voices. An example of this imitation can be heard on the intro part of Dizzy Gillespie's version of "Chega de Saudade" (from the "Dizzy on the French Riviera" album, 1965) composed by Antônio Carlos Jobim. The cuíca can also be heard played by the Brazilian percussionist Airto Moreira on the 1999 reissue bonus track "Feio", on Miles Davis' album Bitches Brew. The instrument was also used in "Could You Be Loved" by Bob Marley and The Wailers, "Soul Bossa Nova" by Quincy Jones, "Bird of Beauty" by Stevie Wonder, and "Me and Julio Down by the Schoolyard" by Paul Simon. Along with samba, the cuíca is one of the mainly used Brazilian instruments in jazz-rock, free jazz, and Latin jazz.

See also
 Buhay
 Friction drum
 Lion's roar (instrument)

References

Drums
Friction drums
Brazilian percussion
Pitched percussion instruments